Ítalo Andrés Díaz Muñoz (born 21 June 1971) is a Chilean former footballer and current manager. His last team coached was Deportes Santa Cruz.

His oldest son Paulo plays as centre back for Argentine Primera División club San Lorenzo. His younger son Nicolas plays for Palestino.

References

External links
 
 

1971 births
Living people
Chilean footballers
Chile international footballers
Cobreloa footballers
Coquimbo Unido footballers
Audax Italiano footballers
Curicó Unido footballers
Magallanes footballers
Santiago Morning footballers
Provincial Osorno footballers
Deportes Melipilla footballers
Deportes Santa Cruz footballers
Chilean Primera División players
Primera B de Chile players
Association football defenders